Huge Davies (born Hugh Davies) is a musical comedian known for deadpan delivery whilst wearing a full sized Yamaha keyboard strapped to himself.

Born with the first name Hugh, he performed as Huge, an old nickname, when first performing in Aberdeen, for the sake of anonymity.

Davies was nominated for the Best Newcomer award  at the 2019 Edinburgh Festival Fringe for his debut solo show The Carpark which was described as "well-crafted, well-structured and well-performed" by Chortle. The keyboard was described in The Scotsman as “more like a bank of special effects, rather than merely a musical instrument.”

Davies was a semi-finalist in the BBC New Comedy Award in 2017. Davies has appeared on Comedy Central Live at the Comedy Store, Roast Battle and as a writer and performer on BBC flagship satirical radio programme The Now Show. Davies acted in BBC Two comedy series The First Team. Davies has appeared on celebrity game show Guessable alongside host Sara Pascoe, Alan Davies and Nish Kumar amongst others.

On 16 December 2021, Channel 4 commissioned a new three-part short form scripted comedy series, The Artists, created, written by and starring, Huge Davies. The series premiered on Channel 4 Comedy YouTube from 30 December 2021 and is available through the on demand service All 4.

References

External links

British male comedians
Year of birth missing (living people)
Living people